Bernardino Maffei (Bergamo, 27 January 1514 – Rome, 16 July 1553) was an Italian archbishop and cardinal.

He studied jurisprudence at Padua, and during the frequent absence of Dandino acted as secretary to Cardinal Alessandro Farnese, and later to Pope Paul III. 

On 12 March 1547, he was made Bishop of Massa Marittima, Bishop of Caserta (June 1549), and then Archbishop of Chieti (November 1549), and on 8 April 1549, raised to the purple. He was on intimate terms with St. Ignatius Loyola and was highly esteemed by pope Julius III. His commentary on the "Letters of Cicero" is one of the best. He also wrote: "De inscriptionibus et imaginibus veterum numismatum".

References

Specific

Archbishops of Chieti
Bishops of Massa
16th-century Italian cardinals
16th-century Italian Roman Catholic archbishops
1514 births
1549 deaths
Clergy from Bergamo
Italian Renaissance humanists